HD 118203 is a star located in the northern circumpolar constellation of Ursa Major. It has the proper name Liesma, which means flame, and it is the name of a character from the Latvian poem Staburags un Liesma (Staburags and Liesma). The name was selected in the NameExoWorlds campaign by Latvia, during the 100th anniversary of the IAU.

The apparent visual magnitude of HD 118203 is 8.06, which means it is invisible to the naked eye but it can be seen using binoculars or a telescope. Based on parallax measurements, it is located at a distance of 302 light years from the Sun.   The star is drifting closer with a radial velocity of −29 km/s. Based on its position and space velocity this is most likely (97% chance) an older thin disk star. An exoplanet has been detected in a close orbit around the star.

The spectrum of this star matches a K-type dwarf with a class of K0. Its absolute magnitude of 3.32 is too high for a K-type main-sequence star, indicating that it has begun to evolve on the subdwarf stage. This is confirmed by the surface gravity, which is too low for a typical dwarf star of this class. It has a low level of chromospheric activity, which means a low level of radial velocity jitter for planet detection purposes. The star has 1.23 times the mass of the Sun and double the Sun's radius. It is around 5.4 billion years old and is spinning with a projected rotational velocity of 7.0 km/s. HD 118203 is radiating 3.8 times the luminosity of the Sun from its photosphere at an effective temperature of 5,741 K.

In 2006, a hot Jupiter candidate was reported in an eccentric orbit around this star. It was discovered using the radial velocity method based on observation of high-metallicity stars begun in 2004. In 2020, it was found that this is a transiting planet, which allowed the mass and radius of the body to be determined. This exoplanet has more than double the mass of Jupiter and a 13% greater radius. The fact that the parent star is among the brighter known planet hosts (as of 2020) makes it an interesting object for further study.

See also
 List of extrasolar planets
 List of stars in Ursa Major

References

K-type subgiants
Planetary systems with one confirmed planet
Ursa Major (constellation)
Durchmusterung objects
118203
066192
1271